Bennetts Green is a suburb of the City of Lake Macquarie in New South Wales, Australia, located  southwest of Newcastle's central business district on the eastern side of Lake Macquarie.

Economy
It contains very few homes and is mainly a commercial shopping, small factory-warehouse area.

Current businesses include:
 Harvey Norman
 Bing Lee
 Supercheap Auto
 BCF
 Fantastic Furniture

It also was the home of the very first Harvey Norman Computer Superstore, which was set up in 1993.

Other businesses that have been in the area include:
 AMF Bowling alley
 Retravision
 Joyce Mayne
 Skatel Roller Rink
 Norman Ross Clearance Centre

New Retail Development
In 2016 land on the opposite side of the highway to the existing retail development was originally sold to Woolworths Limited for $20.3M for a proposed development that would contain a Masters hardware store, however due to the collapse of the Masters chain the site was then sold to the Spotlight Group for a proposed $100M development including:
 Bunnings Warehouse
 Spotlight
 Anaconda
 McDonald's
 KFC
 BP
 Road Tech Marine
 Nick Scali Furniture
 PETstock
 several smaller as yet unnamed businesses
The first of the businesses including Anaconda, Road Tech Marine and BP commenced operation at the grand opening of the new retail development on 31 October 2020.

References

External links
 History of Bennetts Green (Lake Macquarie City Library)

Suburbs of Lake Macquarie